Vasile Usturoi (born 3 April 1997) is a Romanian-born Belgian amateur boxer who won a gold medal at the 2022 European Championships. For the first time since 1951, Usturoi ensured that a European boxing title came into the hands of a Belgian.

Personal life
Born in Romania, Usturoi moved to Belgium when he was 12. He is a football fan and a supporter of team Steaua București. Usturoi means garlic in Romanian language.

References

Belgian male boxers
1997 births
Living people
Sportspeople from Bucharest
Featherweight boxers
Southpaw boxers
Belgian people of Romanian descent
Naturalised citizens of Belgium